James O'Leary may refer to:
James A. O'Leary (1889–1944), American congressman
James Patrick O'Leary (1869–1925), American gambler